Ray Solari (born c. 1928) was a former American football player and coach. He was a two-time letter winner at the University of California at Berkeley, in 1949 and 1950. He was drafted by the Cleveland Browns in the 1951 NFL Draft. Solari served as the head football coach at Menlo College in Atherton, California from 1972 to 1994, compiling a record of 108–105–8. He was the head football coach at South Pasadena High School in South Pasadena, California from 1956 to 1971, tallying a mark of 120–43–5.

References

Year of birth missing (living people)
1920s births
Possibly living people
American football guards
California Golden Bears football players
Menlo Oaks football coaches
High school football coaches in California